Stages is the second and final album from American rock band Vedera. It was released digitally on Epic Records on October 6, 2009. The album was produced by Mike Flynn and Warren Huart (The Fray, Augustana). Rough cuts of "Back to the Middle," "Satisfy," "Forgive You," and "Taking Chances" have been made available on the band's MySpace page. The album and few songs have gotten most of its major popularity after the band was featured on an episode of MTV's The Hills.

Track listing 
"Greater Than" – 3:37
"Loving Ghosts" – 4:40
"Satisfy" – 3:21
"Forgive You" – 3:08
"Goodbye My Love" – 3:26
"Back To The Middle" – 3:45
"Even I" – 3:58
"A World Apart" – 3:58
"Look Around" – 3:52
"If You Go" – 3:46
"The Rain" – 4:57
"We Sing" – 4:16
"Move Forward" (iTunes exclusive) - 5:05

Chart performances

Album

Singles

References

Vedera albums
2009 albums
Epic Records albums